Al-Mutawakkil (Arabic: المتوكل) is an Islamic epithet (Laqab), It is actually the title of Islamic prophet Muhammad in the Qur'an. In the 233 AH, the tenth Abbasid caliph Al-Mutawakkil adopted this title. He ruled from 847 until 861. Al-Mutawakkil was the first and most famous bearer of this title among the rulers.

Centuries later after caliph al-Mutawakkil death, other rulers also adopted this title.

Al-Mutawakkil may also refer to:
Nasib al-Mutawakkiliyyah, (died 860s) was one of the spouse of Abbasid caliph Al-Mutawakkil (r. 847–861).
Shuja, was mother of Abbasid caliph Al-Mutawakkil was also known as Umm al-Mutawakkil (meaning: Mother of Al-Mutawakkil).
Sultan of Morocco
Musa ibn Faris al-Mutawakkil (r. 1384–1386) was the Sultan of the Marinid Sultanate.
Caliphs of Cairo
Al-Mutawakkil I (r. 1362–1383 and 1389–1406) was the caliph of Cairo for the Mamluk Sultanate.
Al-Mutawakkil II (r. 1479–1497) the caliph of Cairo for the Mamluk Sultanate.
Al-Mutawakkil III (d. 1543) was the last caliph of Cairo for the Mamluk Sultanate.
 Rulers of Ifriqiya
Abu al-Abbas Ahmad al-Fadl al-Mutawakkil (r. 1347–1350) (died 1350) was the ruler of Ifriqiya from Hafsid dynasty
Abu Abdallah Muhammad IV al-Mutawakkil (r. 1494–1526), (died 1526) was the ruler of Ifriqiya from the Hafsid dynasty.

Imams of Yemen
Al-Mutawakkil Ahmad bin Sulayman (1106–1171)
Al-Mutawakkil al-Mutahhar bin Yahya (1218–1298)
Al-Mutawakkil al-Mutahhar (r. 1436–1474)
Al-Mutawakkil Yahya Sharaf ad-Din (1473–1555)
Al-Mutawakkil Isma'il (c. 1610–1676)
Al-Mutawakkil al-Qasim (d. 1727)
Al-Mutawakkil Ahmad (1756–1816)
Al-Mutawakkil Muhammad (d. 1849)
Al-Mutawakkil al-Muhsin (d. 1878)
Places
 Al-Mutawakkiliyyah, the part of Samarra city founded by caliph al-Mutawakkil (r. 847–861).
 Mutawakkilite Kingdom, a dynasty that ruled over northwestern part of what is now Yemen from 1918 to 1970.